Chemokine (C-C motif) ligand 21 (CCL21) is a small cytokine belonging to the CC chemokine family. This chemokine is also known as 6Ckine (because it has six conserved cysteine residues instead of the four cysteines typical to chemokines), exodus-2, and secondary lymphoid-tissue chemokine (SLC). The gene for CCL21 is located on human chromosome 9. CCL21 elicits its effects by binding to a cell surface chemokine receptor known as CCR7.

In human lymph nodes, the fibroblastic reticular cells (FRCs) express CCL21 as a chemoattractant to guide naive, CCR7 expressing T cells to the T cell zone.

References

External links

Further reading 

 
 
 
 
 
 
 
 
 
 
 
 
 
 
 
 
 
 

Cytokines